Sunhe may refer to:

 Sunhe Station, Beijing Subway, China
 Sunhe, Beijing, in Shunyi District, Beijing, China